Elektor (ἠλέκτωρ) is also an ancient Greek name or epithet of the Sun, see Helios.

Elektor, also known as Elektor Magazine, is a monthly magazine about all aspects of electronics, originally published in the Netherlands as Elektronica Wereld in 1961 and latterly Elektuur in 1964, and now published worldwide in many languages including English, German, Dutch, French, Greek (September 1982 to May 2008), Spanish, Swedish, Portuguese (European and Brazilian) and Italian with distribution in over 50 countries. The English language edition of Elektor was launched in 1975 and is read worldwide.

Elektor (in Dutch: Elektuur, in Greek: ελέκτορ) was founded in 1960 by the Dutch Bob W. van der Horst. It was and still is a leading publisher with a vast loyal group of readers around the world. Not only hobbyists but also professionals.

Elektor publishes a vast range of electronic projects, background articles and designs aimed at engineers, enthusiasts, students and professionals. To help readers build featured projects, Elektor also offer PCBs (printed circuit boards) of many of their designs, as well as kits and modules. If the project employs a microcontroller and/or PC software, as is now often the case, Elektor normally supply the source code and files free of charge via their website. Most PCB artwork is also available from their website.

Elektor also publishes books, CDs and DVDs about audio, microprocessors, software, programming languages and general purpose electronics.

In December 2009, Elektor announced that for the American market a strategic cooperation would be entered with Steve Ciarcia's Circuit Cellar magazine In 2014, Circuit Cellar magazine separated from Elektor.

It also features articles about vintage electronics e.g. from the 1960s called retronics.

The German issue has .

See also 
 Elektor TV Games Computer
 Elektor Junior Computer
  (former translator of the German Elektor edition)

References

Further reading
   (The file describes the EASM and various other hex file formats.)

External links 
 Elektor English language website
 Elektor India

1961 establishments in the Netherlands
Dutch-language magazines
Monthly magazines published in the Netherlands
Science and technology magazines published in the Netherlands
Magazines established in 1961
Hobby electronics magazines